Paul Anthony Mitchell (August 10, 1920 – March 11, 2017) was an American football defensive end and tackle who played two seasons with the New York Yanks of the National Football League. He played college football at the University of Minnesota where he was an All-American. He previously attended Edison High School in Minneapolis, Minnesota. Mitchell also played in the All-America Football Conference for the Los Angeles Dons from 1946 to 1948, and for the New York Yankees from 1948 to 1950. He is a member of the University of Minnesota Hall of Fame. Mitchell died in March 2017 at the age of 96.

References

1920 births
2017 deaths
American football defensive ends
Los Angeles Dons players
Minnesota Golden Gophers football players
New York Yankees (AAFC) players
New York Yanks players
Players of American football from Minneapolis
Edison High School (Minnesota) alumni